Chief of Air Force (FVC) is the most senior appointment in the Swedish Air Force. The position Chief of Air Force was introduced in 1926 and the current form in 2014.

History
The position and the staff agency "Chief of the Air Force" (C FV) was created for a central leadership of the Air Force in peacetime through the formation of the Swedish Air Force as an independent military branch which took place on 1 July 1926. Following a larger reorganization of the Swedish Armed Forces in 1994, the staff agency Chief of the Air Force ceased to exist as an independent agency. Instead, the post Chief of Air Force Command (C FVL) was created at the then newly instituted Swedish Armed Forces Headquarters. In 1998, the Swedish Armed Forces was again reorganized. Most of the duties of the Chief of Air Force Command were transferred to the newly instituted post of "Inspector General of the Air Force" (GI FV). The post is similar to that of the "Inspector General of the Army" and the "Inspector General of the Navy".

The Inspector General had two roles, partly to be head of the Air Force Center, and partly to be the main representative of the Air Force. The meaning of the latter task was that the Inspector General was the air force's figurehead both towards the air force personnel and within the Swedish Armed Forces in general and towards society and the outside world. As commander, he would represent everyone who has their work in the air force. To be able to solve this task, the Inspector General was part of the Swedish Armed Forces' senior command – the Military Command (Militärledningen). In this he represented the air force but also had an important role as an "independent" adviser to the Supreme Commander of the Swedish Armed Forces. The Inspector General also played an important representative role in connection with the then increasing international operations. He represented the air force in connection with various forms of high-level visits within and outside the country. He also served as host when other nations' air force commanders visited Sweden.

The Inspector General was later renamed "Inspector of the Air Force" (FVI). On 1 January 2014, the "Chief of Air Force" (FVC) position was reinstated in the Swedish Armed Forces. The position has not the same duties as before.

Tasks
Tasks of the Chief of Air Force:
Lead the units which the Chief of Swedish Armed Forces Training and Development has distributed
To the Chief of Swedish Armed Forces Training and Development propose the development of the units' abilities
Being the foremost representative of the units
Represent the units and the area of ability in international contacts

Heraldry
The command flag of the Chief of Air Force is drawn by Brita Grep and embroidered by hand by the company Libraria. Blazon: "Fessed in yellow and blue; on yellow two blue batons of command with sets of open yellow crowns placed two and one in saltire, on blue a winged two-bladed yellow propeller."

List of chiefs

|-style="text-align:center;"
!colspan=7|Chief of the Air Force (Chefen för flygvapnet, C FV)

 

|-style="text-align:center;"
!colspan=7|Chief of Air Force Command (Chef för flygvapenledningen, C FVL)

|-style="text-align:center;"
!colspan=7|Inspector General of the Air Force (Generalinspektör för flygvapnet, GI FV)

|-style="text-align:center;"
!colspan=7|Inspector of the Air Force (Flygvapeninspektör, FVI)

|-style="text-align:center;"
!colspan=7|Chief of Air Force (Flygvapenchef, FVC)

List of deputy chiefs

|-style="text-align:center;"
!colspan=7|Deputy Inspector General of Air Force (Ställföreträdande generalinspektör för flygvapnet)

|-style="text-align:center;"
!colspan=7|Deputy Chief of Air Force (Ställföreträdande flygvapenchef)

See also
Chief of Army (Sweden)
Chief of Navy (Sweden)

Footnotes

References

Notes

Print

Sweden
Swedish Air Force
 
Military appointments of Sweden